John Zanni (born June 20, 1962) is the Chief Executive Officer of Acronis SCS, an Arizona-based edge data security and cyber protection company that provides software to the US public sector. As part of this role, he often speaks at conferences, publishes articles, and participates in media interviews to discuss cybersecurity strategies, tools, and best practices. Prior to becoming Acronis SCS' CEO, Zanni held various leadership and management positions at Acronis, Parallels, and Microsoft.

Before joining the tech industry in 1994, Zanni managed his family-owned French restaurant, Le Rendezvous, in Newbury Park, California.

Career 
 1980–1993: Chef-owner, Le Rendezvous Restaurant, California.
 1994–2010: General Manager, Worldwide Hosting and Cloud Industry, Microsoft.
 2010–2013: Vice President of Service Provider Marketing and Alliances, Parallels.
 2013–2014: Chief Marketing Officer, Parallels.
 2014–2015: Senior Vice President of Cloud and Hosting Sales, Acronis.
 2015–2017: Chief Marketing Officer and Senior Vice President of Channel and Cloud Strategy, Acronis.
 2017–2018: President, Acronis.
 2018–2019: President, Acronis Foundation.
 2018 – present: CEO, Acronis SCS.

See also 
 Acronis
 Parallels, Inc.

References 

Living people
1962 births
California State University, Northridge alumni
People from Santa Monica, California